James Brannick (1889 – 10 August 1917) was an English professional footballer who played as an inside right in the Scottish League for St Mirren and in the Football League for Everton.

Personal life 
Prior to becoming a professional footballer, Brannick worked as a dyer's finisher in a bleaching and dying works. After the outbreak of the First World War in 1914, Brannick enlisted as a private in the Lancashire Fusiliers in Cheetham. His elder brother Richard was killed near Ypres in October 1915. Brannick was killed during the capture of Westhoek on 10 August 1917 and is commemorated on the Menin Gate.

Career statistics

References

1889 births
1917 deaths
Footballers from Manchester
English footballers
English Football League players
Association football inside forwards
Everton F.C. players
British Army personnel of World War I
Lancashire Fusiliers soldiers
British military personnel killed in World War I
St Mirren F.C. players
Scottish Football League players
Atherton F.C. players
Rochdale A.F.C. wartime guest players